Secrets and Sins is the first full-length album on Capitol-EMI of Canada by Canadian singer, Luba and band.  Produced by Daniel Lanois, this breakout album won Luba Juno Awards for "Best Female Vocalist" and "Female Vocalist of the Year" in 1985.  Included is the calypso-reggae style hit single "Let It Go," later featured on the motion picture soundtrack for 9½ Weeks.  Other popular singles include "Secrets and Sins," "Storm Before the Calm" and "Everytime I See Your Picture".

Track listing
"Secrets and Sins" – 3:43 *
"Everytime I See Your Picture" – 4:01 * 
"Let It Go" – 3:45 *
"Sacrificial Heart" – 3:30
"Still the Voices" - 4:37
"Young Guns" - 3:29
"One with You" - 5:10
"Private Wars" - 3:15
"Storm Before the Calm" - 3:21 *
"Resurrect the Love" - 4:25

* Different releases contain different mixes of these songs.

Personnel
 Luba: All Lead & Backing Vocals
 Peter Marunzak: Drums & Percussion
 Michael (Bell) Zwonok: Bass & Backing Vocals
 Mark Lyman: Guitars & Backing Vocals
 Pierre Marchand: Keyboards & Backing Vocals
 Additional Percussion: Dick Smith, Daniel Lanois
 Additional Backing Vocals: Shawne Jackson, Sharon Lee Williams

References
 The Ectophiles' Guide to Good Music. Luba: Credits. Retrieved Apr. 17, 2007.

External links
 Official Luba Website
 Luba at canoe.ca
 Luba on MySpace

1984 albums
Luba (singer) albums
Albums produced by Daniel Lanois